The Norwegian armed forces in exile ("Outside Front") were remnants of the armed forces of Norway that continued to fight the Axis powers from Allied countries, such as Britain and Canada, after they had escaped the German conquest of Norway during World War II.

Background

Norway was neutral in World War I and tried to remain neutral in World War II. Neutrality was maintained until the German invasion began on 9 April 1940. With the help of the Allied forces, the Norwegian defense initially saw a number of successes. For instance, troops were able to take over most of the French line north of the Rombaksfjord and were poised for a major offensive, which was scheduled on June 8. The attack was, however, canceled by General Antoine Bethouart, following an Allied pullout from Norway. Despite reservations on the part of the Norwegians, an evacuation plan was put in effect that involved the exile of the King of Norway to Britain and the withdrawal of free Norwegian forces, which would be commanded by General Carl Gustav Fleischer. General Ruge stayed, refusing to abandon the remaining troops. He instead supervised an orderly withdrawal, successfully demobilizing the back areas before the Germans found out what was going on. The evacuation involved a British battalion stationed at Dombas to cover the withdrawing troops while the Norwegians provided the transport. Britain sent the light cruiser HMS Glasgow as transport of King Haakon VII, the royal family, and his government.

Norwegian coastal artillery sufficiently delayed the German capture of Oslo to permit the King of Norway, the Royal family and the government to flee the capital, and eventually make their way to the United Kingdom. The Norwegian Army was forced northwards from the capital towards Lillehammer where they were joined by two British brigades. It was decided that the Allies should concentrate on the recapture of Narvik, which was entered by the Norwegian 6th Division on 28 May. However, the Allied garrison of the port was unsustainable and it had been evacuated to the United Kingdom by 7 June 1940. Thirteen ships, five aircraft and 500 men from the Royal Norwegian Navy followed. There were about 25,000 Norwegian soldiers who escaped and eventually served in the Free Norwegian forces overseas.

On 10 June, Ruge signed the treaty of capitulation for the Norwegian Army. The Germans occupied Norway until the German capitulation on 8 May 1945.

Exiled forces

Army

Unlike the navy and air force, the army was not able to easily escape, and almost all remained in Norway after the German invasion. Some of these men would form part of the Norwegian resistance forces during the rest of the war until Norway regained freedom in May 1945.

Norwegian soldiers in the United Kingdom formed units including the Norwegian Independent Company 1, and 5 Troop of the No. 10 (Inter-Allied) Commando. During the years in exile in Britain the bulk of the Norwegian Army consisted of a brigade in Dumfries, and smaller units stationed in Iceland, Jan Mayen, Svalbard and South Georgia. Some units were sent to take part in the liberation of Finnmark.

Navy

The forces that had escaped to the United Kingdom were slowly built up over the next few years. On D-Day (6 June 1944), the Royal Norwegian Navy attached to the invasion of Normandy numbered ten ships and 1,000 sailors.

During the war the RNoN operated 118 ships; by the end of the war it had 58 ships and 7,500 men in service.

Air Force
Norway retained separate air forces for the navy and the army until the establishment of the Royal Norwegian Air Force in 1944.

Some aircraft that were ordered prior to hostilities were delivered but few were ready for combat. After the flight to the United Kingdom a training base was established in Canada and many of the pilots joined the RAF in both bomber and fighter commands. Most notable are the two Spitfire squadrons, 331 and 332.

On 1 November 1944 these squadrons were incorporated into the new Royal Norwegian Air Force and were renamed as such along with new squadrons: 330 (Northrop N-3PB, Catalina, Sunderlands), 333 (Catalina, Mosquito) and later 334 (Mosquitos).

Police troops in Sweden 

Norwegian police troops, known as Rikspoliti, were recruited from refugees in Sweden during the war. They were funded by the Norwegian government in exile, and trained by the Swedish military. Originally intended to help maintain order in a post-war Norway, 1,442 were flown in early to assist in the Liberation of Finnmark.

See also
 Bamse, heroic St. Bernard dog and mascot for Free Norwegian forces
 99th Infantry Battalion (United States)
 Shetland bus
 Norwegian resistance movement
 Operation Doomsday

References

Military units and formations of Norway in World War II
Armies in exile during World War II
Military units and formations established in 1940